The Peak Performance Project was a seven-year, $5.2 million music initiative funded by the Jim Pattison Group, to provide financial support to emerging Canadian artists in the British Columbia and Alberta markets. The $100,000 prize for the winner was one of the largest prize packages for a music competition in Canadian music history.

History

The Peak Performance Project launched in 2009 by Vancouver's 102.7 The PEAK. The project wrapped up in 2015, and in the past featured over 100 artists from throughout British Columbia. The seven year Alberta PEAK Performance Project was launched in April 2014 on 95.3 The PEAK Calgary. In BC, the project is administered by the Music BC Industry Association. In Alberta, the Alberta Music Industry Association handles administration. In 2016 the Alberta format switched over to a country format, aligning itself with new station Wild 95.3 New Country.

Several notable and successful Canadian acts from a wide variety of genres have taken part in the project throughout its history, including Said The Whale, Dear Rouge, Tourist Company, The Belle Game, Jordan Klassen, Rykka, Current Swell, and We Are the City.

Purpose

The purpose of the PEAK Performance Project is to assist emerging artists from British Columbia and Alberta through education, development, and promotion. The project also aims to contribute to the larger music community by building musical links between the two provinces. Each project runs separately from the other, sharing only Bootcamp time together. At the end of each project cycle, the top three bands are awarded $100,000 for 1st, $75,000 for 2nd, and $50,000 for 3rd place respectively.

Timeline

The project typically launched in the spring of each year, with applications being open for a month. Applications consisted of two digital files of an artist's music, the artist's bio, an essay written by the artist on why they should be included, a live video of the band performing, and the band's current press photo. A panel of industry professionals picked the selected bands (usually 12 or 20 per province) out of a pool of hundreds of entries, and the results were announced in June of each year at a kick-off concert that featured past Peak Performance "Alumni" bands performing.

Once accepted, each band was awarded a $3,000–$5,000 (depending on the year) "Basecamp" award. The first challenge put to the bands was to spend the money in a way that immediately addressed a need in the band's career. Throughout the duration of each year's project, each band had their music featured on 102.7 The Peak in Vancouver (for BC bands), and on 95.3 The Peak in Calgary (for Alberta bands). To kick off the project officially, and introduce the bands to the public, the project featured the bands at a local festival. Throughout the summer months, the bands were given a series of challenges related to various aspects of a DIY music career and developing sections of the band's business in terms of merchandise, social media profiles, press awareness, philanthropic efforts, marketing strategies, budgeting, and self-development. In August, all bands were sent to a "Bootcamp" where they interacted with industry specialists, took courses and workshops from tutors and trainers, and performed live for experienced live coaches.

During September and October, the project put on a series of "showcases", each featuring a handful of the bands. These shows were open to the public, but also were watched by a panel of judges who gave each band a "live score" that went towards their overall mark. Public voting opened in the last week of October, and each band's percentage of the vote also went towards their overall mark. At the end of October, the bands turned in a final report which summarized the results of their aforementioned challenges, as well as a marketing and budgeting plan based on their potential winnings. A panel of judges reviewed these, and this was also factored in to each band's score.

Early in November, the top three bands were announced in no particular order during a live broadcast on 102.7 The Peak. In previous years, there was a $10,000 and $5,000 4th and 5th place prize, and these artists would be announced during this broadcast as well. The order of the winning bands was revealed after each finalist band performed at the Commodore Ballroom at a wrap up event in late November.

Past participants

Below are the bands that have participated in past years, in alphabetical order, along with their hometown. Bands that placed are listed first, in order of placement. If a band did not place in the top three, they were allowed to apply for the next year's project.

2009
 First Place: We Are the City – Kelowna
 Second Place: The Left - Vancouver
 Third Place: Bend Sinister – Vancouver
 Adaline - Vancouver
 Adrian Glynn - Vancouver
 Alexandria Maillot - Courtenay
 Ben Sigston - Vancouver
 Bodhi Jones - Vancouver
 Danny Echo - Coquitlam
 Familia - Maple Ridge
 Freeflow - Vancouver
 Garrett Kato - Port Coquitlam
 Kuba Oms - Victoria
 Run The Red Light - Vancouver
 Sweetheart - Vancouver
 Tea - Vancouver
 The Painted Birds - Vancouver
 TV Heart Attack - Vancouver
 Wassabi Collective - Nelson

2010
 First Place: Kyprios – North Vancouver
 Second Place: Said the Whale - Vancouver
 Third Place: Vince Vaccaro – Victoria
 Fourth Place: Acres of Lions - Victoria
 Fifth Place: Aidan Knight - Victoria
 Adaline - Vancouver
 Behind Sapphire - Vancouver
 Ben Sigston - Vancouver
 Bodhi Jones - Vancouver
 Christina Maria - Surrey
 Christopher Arruda - Nanaimo
 Debra-Jean - Vancouver
 Greg Sczebel - Salmon Arm
 Jess Hill - Vancouver
 Kuba Oms - Victoria
 Parlour Steps - Vancouver
 Steph Macpherson - Victoria
 Yes Nice - Burnaby
 Yuca
 41st and Home - Vancouver

2011
 First Place: Current Swell – Victoria
 Second Place: The Boom Booms - Vancouver
 Third Place: The Matinée – Vancouver
 Fourth Place: Hilary Grist - Vancouver
 Fifth Place: Acres of Lions - Victoria
 Ashleigh Eymann - Victoria
 Avairis - Victoria
 Behind Sapphire - Vancouver
 The Belle Game - Vancouver
 Fields of Green - West Kelowna
 Jasper Sloan Yip - Vancouver
 Lindsay Bryan - Victoria
 Maurice - Victoria
 The Never Surprise - Vancouver
 The Oh Wells - Surrey
 Rococode - North Vancouver/Victoria
 Sex With Strangers - Vancouver
 Treelines - Vancouver via Kelowna
 41st and Home - Vancouver

2012
 First Place: Dear Rouge – Vancouver
 Second Place: Jordan Klassen - Vancouver
 Third Place: Dominique Fricot – Vancouver
 Fourth Place: J.P. Maurice - Vancouver
 Fifth Place: Mike Edel - Victoria
 Alexandria Maillot - Vancouver Island
 Ali Milner - Whistler
 beekeeper - Vancouver
 Facts - Vancouver
 Fields of Green - Kelowna
 Georgia Murray - Port McNeill
 Headwater - Vancouver
 Portage and Main - Vancouver
 Redgy Blackout - Vancouver
 T. Nile - Galiano Island
 Tough Lovers - Vancouver
 The Fugitives - Vancouver
 The Gay Nineties - Vancouver
 The Harpoonist & The Axe Murderer - Nanaimo
 The River and the Road - Vancouver

2013
 First Place: Rykka – Surrey
 Second Place: Hannah Epperson – Vancouver
 Third Place: Bestie – Vancouver
 Fourth Place: Good for Grapes – Surrey
 Fifth Place: Willhorse – Golden
 Amble Greene – Ocean Park
 Coldwater Road – Vancouver
 Greg Drummond – Port Moody
 Melissa Endean – Vancouver
 Fallbrigade – Victoria
 Luca Fogale – Burnaby
 Lydia Hol – Vancouver
 Bodhi Jones – Vancouver
 Lions in the Street – Vancouver
 Dougal Bain McLean – Victoria
 Oh No! Yoko – Abbotsford
 Rolla Olak – Vancouver
 The Lion The Bear The Fox – Ladysmith/Vancouver
 Towers and Trees – Victoria
 Van Damsel – Kamloops

2014
 First Place: Good for Grapes – Surrey
 Second Place: Derrival – Langley
 Third Place: The Tourist Company - North Vancouver
 Altered By Mom - Vancouver
 Damn Fools - Vancouver
 David Newberry - Vancouver
 GOODWOOD ATOMS - Vancouver
 Jodi Pederson - Vernon
 Jon Bryant - Surrey
 Miss Quincy & The Showdown - Fort St. John
 Shred Kelly - Fernie
 The Wild Romantics - Nanaimo

2015
 First Place: Bed of Stars - Abbotsford
 Second Place: JP Maurice - Victoria
 Third Place: Van Damsel - Kamloops
 Chersea - Port Coquitlam
 Find The Others - Bowen Island
 Jesse Roper - Victoria
 Joy District - Comox Valley
 Little India - Langley
 Mike Edel - Victoria
 Mindil Beach - Vancouver
 Smash Boom Pow - Vancouver
 Windmills - Vernon

References

Music of Vancouver
Music competitions in Canada
2009 establishments in British Columbia